Typha shuttleworthii is a species of cattail found in southern Europe as well as in Iran and Turkey.

Typha shuttleworthii is very similar to T. latifolia and has long been considered conspecific with that species. More recent authors have, however, regarded it as a separate species. It differs from T. latifolia in that the male inflorescence is less than half the length of the female inflorescence, as well as having shorter anthers, smaller seeds, and narrower leaves.

References

shuttleworthii
Freshwater plants
Flora of Europe
Flora of Iran
Flora of Turkey
Taxa named by Otto Wilhelm Sonder